Patrick Chiwala (born 10 January 1953) is a Zambian long-distance runner. He competed in the marathon at the 1980 Summer Olympics.

References

1953 births
Living people
Athletes (track and field) at the 1980 Summer Olympics
Zambian male long-distance runners
Zambian male marathon runners
Olympic athletes of Zambia
Athletes (track and field) at the 1978 Commonwealth Games
Commonwealth Games competitors for Zambia
Place of birth missing (living people)